Super Goal! 2, known in Japan as  is an international soccer video game published by Jaleco for the Super NES/Super Famicom console.

Summary
The Japanese version allows players to compete for the Super Cup either with or against Takeda Nobuhiro, one of the greatest football players in all of Japan. There are teams from Europe, North America, Central America, Caribbean, South America, Africa, and Asia, Oceania. The North American release (published as part of the Goal! series) removed the references to Takeda.

See also
 Goal!
 Super Soccer

References

External links
 Takeda Nobuhiro no Super Cup Soccer at superfamicom.org
 Japanese title at super-famicom.jp 

1993 video games
Association football video games
Jaleco games
Super Nintendo Entertainment System games
Super Nintendo Entertainment System-only games
Tose (company) games
Video game sequels
Multiplayer and single-player video games
Video games developed in Japan
Video games scored by Takeshi Ichida
Video games scored by Yoshiki Nishimura